Amosov is a Russian masculine surname, derived from the given name Amos. Its feminine counterpart is Amosova. It may refer to

Alexey Amosov (born 1981), Russian sledge hockey player
Nikolai Amosov (1913–2002), Ukrainian heart surgeon
Serafima Amosova (1914–1993), Deputy Regimental Commander of the 46th Guards Night Bomber Aviation Regiment
Zinaida Amosova (born 1950), Soviet cross-country skier
Yaroslav Amosov, Ukrainian MMA fighter

See also
2948 Amosov, an asteroid named after Nikolai Amosov

Russian-language surnames
Patronymic surnames
Surnames from given names